The Serra do Mar Ecological Corridor ( or Corredor de Biodiversidade da Serra do Mar) is a large collection of protected areas in the states of Rio de Janeiro, Minas Gerais, São Paulo and Paraná in southern Brazil that form an ecological corridor connecting areas of Atlantic Forest.

Extent

It encompasses some of the most densely populated areas of Brazil, within which there are several important fragments of Atlantic Forest.
The corridor is one of the areas with the richest biodiversity in the Atlantic Forest.

Purpose

An ecological corridor is an area of great biological importance that consists of a network of protected areas interspersed with varying levels of human occupation and different forms of land use.
The corridor provides integrated management to ensure the survival all species, maintain ecological and evolutionary processes, and develop a strong regional economy based on sustainable use of natural resources.
It allows for the flow of plant and animal genes between the protected areas, thus maintaining genetic diversity.

Mosaics

Protected area mosaics have the potential to strengthen ecological corridors by expanding the scale of conservation planning and increasing the chances of reconnecting natural areas within and between the mosaics.
The Serra do Mar Ecological Corridor contains several protected area mosaics.
The Lagamar Mosaic, covering , was created in May 2006.
It has great importance in conserving Atlantic Forest, and is supported by SOS Mata Atlântica and by the Atlantic Forest Biosphere Reserve.
It was the second mosaic to be created in Brazil, after the Piauí Mosaic, created in March 2005.

A project to create three new protected area mosaics began in December 2005, coordinated by the National Council of the Atlantic Forest Biosphere Reserve.
These were the Bocaina Mosaic, Central Rio de Janeiro Atlantic Forest Mosaic and Mantiqueira Mosaic.
Funding was provided by Conservation International, the Fund for the Global Environment Facility (GEF), the Government of Japan, the MacArthur Foundation and the World Bank.
The Ministry of the Environment gave the mosaics formal structure in March 2007.
Their purpose is to give integrated management of different conservation units in a region, including federal, state, municipal and private units, which may be different form of strictly protected or sustainable use unit.

Notes

Sources

Ecological corridors of Brazil
Protected areas of Rio de Janeiro (state)
Protected areas of São Paulo (state)
Protected areas of Minas Gerais
Protected areas of Paraná (state)